Tímea Babos and Yaroslava Shvedova were the defending champions; however, both players chose not to participate.

Aleksandra Krunić and Kateřina Siniaková won their first main circuit title by defeating Margarita Gasparyan and Alexandra Panova in the final, 6–2, 6–1.

Seeds

Draw

Draw

References
Main Draw

Tashkent Open - Doubles
2014 Tashkent Open